Movinga is an online platform-based moving company with its official headquarters at Moabit, Berlin, Germany. Movinga was founded in 2015. It specializes in house removals and relocation and can also be used to 'find and book' other listed moving companies, based on the buyer's preference.

History 
Founded by Bastian Knutzen and Chris Maslowski in 2016, the company began by booking household moving services for students online. In May 2015, they moved their headquarters from Vallendar to Berlin. Later, the MVP version of the platform was released - a home removal platform built with Ruby on Rails, PostgreSQL, Grape, Babel. In 2016, the company was active in at least seven countries. Today, Silvio Hinteregger and Tobias Hinteregger are the CEOs of the company.

Model 
Movinga's business model is online based. Customers first need to provide their source and destination via the moving website. The quotation for the job is then exchanged with the customer. Once the customer accepts the quoted price, the process is initiated, and the task completed. SMACC, in a digitized process, handles all the invoices of Movinga. The company has also leased street scooters (Electric Minivans) for transportation.

Capital 
Movinga has raised a total of $92.9M in funding from over six rounds of funding.

Acquisition 
Movinga has acquired shares in Move24 and Transfer24.

Awards and recognition 
Movinga has been awarded as the Service Champion 2020 by "DIE WELT" in the category relocation.

Movinga has received the "Deutscher Mittelstandspreis" or "German Mittelstand" Prize for its "valuable contribution to the principles of a social market economy.” The award was presented by the Small and Medium-Size Business Association of the governing Christian Democratic Union.

References

External links
Official Website
Umzugsunternehmen (in German)

Companies based in Berlin
Moving companies
Transport companies established in 2015
2015 establishments in Germany